This is a list of Greek football transfers for the 2009–10 summer transfer window by club. Only transfers of the 2009–10 Superleague Greece clubs are included.

The summer transfer window opened on 1 June 2009, although a few transfers took place prior to that date. The window closed at midnight on 31 August 2009. Players without a club may join one at any time, either during or in between transfer windows.

Transfers

AEK Athens

In:

Out:

Aris

In:

Out:

Asteras Tripolis

In:

Out:

Atromitos

In:

Out:

Ergotelis

In:

Out:

Iraklis

In:

Out:

Kavala

In:

 

Out:

Larissa FC

In:

Out:

Levadiakos

In:

Out:

Olympiacos

In:

Out:

Panathinaikos

In:

 free agent
 for €8,500,000
 for €4,000,000
 for €450,000
 for €100,000
 free agent
 for €3,500,000

Out:

Panionios

In:

Out:

Panthrakikos

In:

Out:

PAOK

In:

Out:

 (return to AJ Auxerre)
 (return to Panathinaikos F.C.)
 (free to PAS Giannina)
 (free to PAS Giannina)
(free to OFI Crete)
(free to Iraklis)
 (free to Kavala)
 (free)
(free to Kavala)
(on loan to Panserraikos)
(on loan to Panserraikos)
(on loan to Olympiakos Volou)
(on loan to PAS Giannina)
(to Atromitos)

PAS Giannina

In:

Out:

Skoda Xanthi

In:

Out:

See also
List of Belgian football transfers summer 2009
List of Bulgarian football transfers summer 2009
List of Cypriot football transfers summer 2009
List of Danish football transfers summer 2009
List of Dutch football transfers summer 2009
List of English football transfers summer 2009
List of German football transfers summer 2009
List of 2009–10 Israeli football transfers
List of Italian football transfers summer 2009
List of Maltese football transfers summer 2009
List of Scottish football transfers 2009–10
List of Serbian football transfers summer 2009
List of Spanish football transfers summer 2009
List of Ukrainian football transfers summer 2009

References

Greece
2009–10 in Greek football
2009